Fox Weather is a digital broadcast television network and streaming channel operated by Fox Corporation which launched on October 25, 2021 to provide weather forecasts and information for the United States. The service is available through select digital subchannels of Fox Television Stations, YouTube TV, The Roku Channel, FuboTV, DirecTV Stream,  Xumo, Amazon Fire TV, its website and mobile apps, the mobile and digital media player apps of Fox, Fox News and Fox Business, the websites of Fox's owned and operated stations, the OTT service Tubi, and simulcasted on weekend mornings from 6 to 9 AM ET on Fox Business and in daytime and various weekend slots on select MyNetworkTV stations.

During significant weather events, Fox Weather is often simulcast on Fox News or Fox Business.

History
On December 9, 2020, Fox News Media announced the forthcoming launch of an ad-supported weather service that would include local and national weather related news. On June 24, 2021, Fox News Media announced a slate of six meteorologists who would make up the team reporting for the channel, joining from other local TV stations.

The channel is overseen by Fox News Media CEO Suzanne Scott and executive Sharri Berg.

News of the launch sparked discussion on how the channel will cover climate change, an issue their sister channel Fox News has often dismissed. Regarding how the issue of climate change will be addressed on the new network, Berg stated in an interview that “...climate change is part of our lives. It’s how we live. It’s not going to be ignored.”

On August 18, 2021, Berg announced that Fox Weather would add three correspondents and five multimedia journalists to the team.

On September 1, 2021, Fox Weather released their first promo and announced that they would be launching in October. The launch date was later announced for October 25.

On October 18, 2021, Berg announced that Fox Weather would add four additional meteorologists and a multimedia journalist to the team.

The network was also added as an over-the-air digital subchannel at the start of 2022 in markets served by the network's owned-and-operated stations group, presumably with local insertion allowing local forecasts and severe weather coverage. A weekend morning simulcast of the channel airs on Fox Business Network from 6 to 8 a.m. ET, which started on December 4.

YouTube TV added Fox Weather on February 2, 2022, becoming the first weather-focused channel to air on the OTT service. On February 8, Berg announced that Fox Weather had also been added to the Amazon News and The Roku Channel OTT services, and would be added to Xumo and FuboTV later in February. Berg also announced that, in addition to its addition to over-the-air digital subchannels, Fox Weather content would be simulcast for 1-2 hours daily on Fox Television Stations' MyNetworkTV and independent stations.

On March 14, 2022, Berg announced that Fox Weather had hired Bryan Norcross as its hurricane specialist. 

On April 12, 2022, Fox Weather announced that it has unveiled a Ford F-250 truck called the "Fox Weather Beast."

On May 2, 2022, Fox Weather debuted an hourly update podcast/report "Fox Weather Update." Weather updates and rolling coverage are also a part of the hourly loop of streaming/Sirius XM station Fox News Headlines 24/7.

On December 7, 2022, Fox News Audio and TuneIn, the live-streaming service announced their long partnership which includes Fox Weather for audio streaming.

Location and team
The channel's headquarters is at Fox News Media's office and draws on their existing meteorologists across US stations as well as dedicated meteorologists for the channel.

Notable current on-air staff
 Amy Freeze – anchor (formerly of WABC-TV, WFLD, WCAU, KMGH-TV, and KPTV)
 Nick Kosir – reporter (formerly of WJZY, KMVT and KBTV-TV)
 Stephen Morgan – anchor (formerly of KRIV, and KRBK)
 Bryan Norcross – tropical storm and hurricane specialist (formerly of WTVJ, WFOR-TV, The Weather Channel, and WPLG)

Programming

Live 
Currently, Fox Weather's schedule consists of the following programs:
 Fox Weather First (Weekdays 6-9 AM ET)
 Weather Command (Weekdays 9 AM-12 PM ET)
 America's Weather Center (Weekdays 12-3 PM ET)
 Fox Weather Now (Weekdays 3-4 PM ET)
 Fox Weather Across America (Weekdays 4-7 PM ET)
 Fox Weather Live (Weeknights 7-10 PM ET)
 Fox Weather First Weekend (Weekends 6-10 AM ET) (6-8 AM ET on Fox Business)
 Fox Weather Live Weekend (Weekends 10 AM-2 PM ET)
 Night Light (Daily 1-6 AM ET)

Pre-recorded 
 Fox Weather @ Night (Weekdays 10 PM-1 AM ET)
 Fox Weather Reports (Weekends 2 PM-1 AM ET)

Affiliates

References

Fox News
Fox Corporation subsidiaries
English-language television stations in the United States
Weather television networks
Internet television channels
Television channels and stations established in 2021